Florida Center for Investigative Reporting (FCIR) was a non-profit founded in 2010 having a stated mission to investigate "corruption, waste and miscarriages of justice". In August 2021, FCIR ceased operations and was absorbed by Inside Climate News.

Investigations
FCIR reported that state of Florida officials allegedly ordered employees of the Florida Department of Environmental Protection not to use the terms global warming, climate change, and sustainability in their communications.

Another investigation by FCIR alleged repeated records requests by private parties to obtain records of businesses that had been hired to work with state agencies, followed, in some cases, by lawsuits.  Legislation has since been introduced to modify Florida's sunshine law so as to protect those businesses.

FCIR has also been in the news for investigating a new trend in Florida toward establishment of toll lanes.  And, in 2011, FCIR helped uncover high school diploma mills.  A description of other investigations by FCIR is available at its website.

References

External links

2010 establishments in Florida
Non-profit organizations based in Florida
American journalism organizations